Alhassane Baldé (born 21 December 1985) is a Guinean-born German Paralympic athlete who competes in long-distance running events in international level events.

Baldé was the second of twins. His disability was caused by a medical error at birth: he was pulled out of the womb in breech position resulting in an injured spine. He and his twin brother were adopted by his aunt and uncle moved to Düsseldorf aged nine months to receive medical treatment.

References

External links
 
 

1985 births
Living people
German male long-distance runners
German male wheelchair racers
Paralympic athletes of Germany
Athletes (track and field) at the 2004 Summer Paralympics
Athletes (track and field) at the 2008 Summer Paralympics
Athletes (track and field) at the 2016 Summer Paralympics
Athletes (track and field) at the 2020 Summer Paralympics
Sportspeople from Bonn
Emigrants from Guinea to Germany